William Anson may refer to:
Sir William Anson, 1st Baronet (1772–1847), general in the British Army
Sir William Anson, 3rd Baronet (1843–1914), British jurist and Liberal Unionist politician

See also
Anson (surname)